Monotomopsis is a genus of beetles in the family Monotomidae, containing the following species:

 Monotomopsis andrewesi Grouvelle, 1908
 Monotomopsis monotomoides Grouvelle, 1896

References

Monotomidae
Cucujoidea genera